El Ghali Boukaa (born 28 September 1981) is a Moroccan equestrian. He competed in the individual jumping event at the 2020 Summer Olympics.

References

External links
 
 
 

1981 births
Living people
Moroccan male equestrians
Olympic equestrians of Morocco
Equestrians at the 2020 Summer Olympics
Place of birth missing (living people)
Show jumping riders
African Games medalists in equestrian
Competitors at the 2019 African Games
African Games gold medalists for Morocco
20th-century Moroccan people
21st-century Moroccan people